The Hasso Plattner Institute (Hasso-Plattner-Institut für Digital Engineering gGmbH), abbreviated  HPI, is a German information technology institute and faculty of the University of Potsdam located in Potsdam near Berlin. The teaching and research of HPI are focused on "IT-Systems Engineering". HPI was founded in 1998, and is the first, and as of 2018, the only entirely privately funded faculty in Germany. It is financed entirely through private funds donated by billionaire Hasso Plattner, who co-founded the software company SAP SE, and is currently the chairman of SAP's supervisory board. In addition to Christoph Meinel and Marcus Kölling, the management of HPI was expanded to include Ralf Herbrich and Tobias Friedrich on 1 November 2022.

History 
The HPI was founded in October 1998 as a public-private partnership. The private partner is the "Hasso Plattner Foundation for Software Systems Engineering", which is the administrative body responsible for the HPI and its only corporate member. The foundation's legal status is that of a GmbH, a limited-liability company according to German law. As the public part of the partnership, the Bundesland Brandenburg provided the estate where several multi-storey buildings were built to form a nice campus. Hasso Plattner declared to provide at least 200 million Euros for the HPI within the first 20 years. He is also actively involved as a lecturer and head of the chair on Enterprise Platform and Integration Concepts, where the in-memory technology was developed. In 2004, he received his honorary professorship from the University of Potsdam.

Since 2007, the HPI maintains a particularly close cooperation with the Hasso Plattner Institute of Design, part of Stanford University's School of Engineering. In addition to the exchange of students and scientists, an annual workshop on Design Thinking is held in Germany. German companies are simultaneously involved in joint international development projects between Potsdam and Palo Alto aimed at simplifying the implementation of such projects on both sides of the Atlantic with the help of tele-teaching technology.

openHPI
In 2012, based on HPI's long lasting tele-TASK research project, openHPI has started to work. openHPI is an Internet educational platform for offering massive open online courses (MOOCs), which is embedded in a global social network. It offers free interactive online courses about different topics in information technology. 
Participants can become familiar with basic topics of computer science, and IT systems engineering as well as with advanced current research topics in IT. They also have the ability to discuss issues and to develop solutions in a virtual community with participants from around the globe.

Rankings and awards
The Center for Higher Education Development (CHE) is an independent private non-profit organization, founded by the German Rectors' Conference and the Bertelsmann Foundation. According to its university ranking in 2020, HPI's Bachelor's and Master's programs are among the four best-ranked computer science programs in the German-speaking countries with the Bachelor's program valued highest in 18 out of 28 analyzed categories and among the best in five additional categories.

In 2012, HPI and SAP received the German Innovation Prize (Deutscher Innovationspreis), a prize awarded by Accenture, EnBW, Evonik and Wirtschaftswoche, for the development of the in-memory database SAP HANA.

References

External links

 Website – Hasso-Plattner-Institut für Softwaresystemtechnik GmbH
 Official website of openHPI
 Official website of tele-TASK
 Official website of HPI School of Design Thinking

University of Potsdam
Systems science education
Universities in Germany
University
Educational institutions established in 1998
1998 establishments in Germany